Parablechnum cordatum (synonyms Blechnum cordatum, Blechnum chilense), the Chilean hard fern or costilla de vaca (Chilean Spanish for "cow's rib"), is a fern of the family Blechnaceae, native to Chile. It is also found in neighboring areas of Argentina and the Juan Fernández Islands.

The fertile fronds are more erect, with narrower pinnae, than the infertile ones.

This plant has gained the Royal Horticultural Society's Award of Garden Merit.

Sources

 Florachilena.cl

Blechnaceae
Ferns of Argentina
Ferns of Chile
Flora of the Juan Fernández Islands
Plants described in 1824
Flora of the Valdivian temperate rainforest